British Pakistani or Pakistani British may refer to:

 British people of Pakistani descent and associated topics
 Britons in Pakistan
 Pakistan–United Kingdom relations (c.f. "a British-Pakistani treaty" or "Pakistani-British treaty")
 Mixed race people of British and Pakistani descent, in the United Kingdom or Pakistan
 Anglo-Indians, people of mixed British and South Asian descent with heritage to the era of colonial rule in India
 People with dual citizenship of the United Kingdom and Pakistan
 Of or relating to British India or the period of British rule in India (which included what is now modern Pakistan)